Jules Victor Abel Eugène Jean Comte (17 October 1846, Paris - 14 December 1912, Paris) was a French art historian and government official.

Life and work 
He studied at the Lycée Bonaparte (now the Lycée Condorcet), and was hired by the Ministry of State in 1866.

In 1881, he was appointed Inspector General of the fine arts schools. Five years later, he was named Director of civic buildings, in charge of the headquarters of what is now the Ministry of National Education. From that time, through 1901, he was involved in expanding the Bibliothèque Nationale. He also participated in restoration projects at the Château de Versailles, and the Domaine national de Saint-Cloud. 

He was awarded the rank of Commander in the Legion of Honor in 1895.

He was elected to the Académie des Beaux-Arts in 1909, where he took Seat #2 in the "Unattached" section; succeeding Émile Michel (deceased).

Publications
 Jules Comte, Tapisserie de Bayeux avec planches, J. Rothschild, 1878

Sources
 Biographical data and references from the Comité des travaux historiques et scientifiques @ La France Savante
 Detailed biography @ the Institut National d'Histoire de l'Art

External links

 Entry for Comte @ the Bibliothèque nationale de France



1846 births
1912 deaths
French art historians
Recipients of the Legion of Honour
Members of the Académie des beaux-arts
People from Paris